This is a list of female librarians.

See also 
 List of librarians
 List of female archivists
 Lists of women

Librarians
Female